= Vologodsky =

Vologodsky (masculine), Vologodskaya (feminine), or Vologodskoye (neuter) may refer to:

- Vologodsky District, a district of Vologda Oblast, Russia
- Vologda Oblast (Vologodskaya oblast), a federal subject of Russia
